The 2019–20 SLC Twenty20 Tournament was a Twenty20 cricket tournament that was held in Sri Lanka. It was played between twenty-six domestic teams in Sri Lanka, with the tournament running from 4 to 21 January 2020. Moors Sports Club were the defending champions.

On the opening day of the tournament, Shehan Jayasuriya scored a century for Chilaw Marians Cricket Club and Mohomed Dilshad took a five-wicket haul for Saracens Sports Club. On the third day, Ashen Bandara scored a century for Saracens Sports Club and Asitha Fernando took six wickets for eight runs for Chilaw Marians Cricket Club. Day five saw Irosh Samarasooriya score an unbeaten 108 from 59 balls for Nugegoda Sports and Welfare Club. The match between Police Sports Club and Sinhalese Sports Club finished as a tie, but no Super Over was played.

Following the conclusion of the group stage, Badureliya Sports Club, Colombo Cricket Club, Nondescripts Cricket Club, Sri Lanka Army Sports Club, Chilaw Marians Cricket Club, Sinhalese Sports Club, Ragama Cricket Club and Colts Cricket Club had all qualified for the quarterfinals. Colombo, Ragama, Chilaw Marians and Nondescripts all won their respective matches to advance to the semi-finals of the tournament. Chilaw Marians won the first semi-final, against Ragama, by 33 runs, and Colombo beat Nondescripts by 10 runs in the second semi-final.

Colombo Cricket Club won the tournament, after they beat Chilaw Marians Cricket Club by four wickets in the final, with the winning runs coming from the final ball of the match.

Group stage

Group A

Group B

Group C

Group D

Knockout stage

Quarterfinals

Finals

References

External links
 Series home at ESPN Cricinfo

SLC Twenty20 Tournament
SLC Twenty20 Tournament